Papua New Guinea competed at the 2018 Commonwealth Games in the Gold Coast, Australia from April 4 to April 15, 2018.

Para table tennis athlete Vero Nime was the country's flag bearer during the opening ceremony.

Competitors
The following is the list of number of competitors participating at the Games per sport/discipline.

Medalists

| style="text-align:left; vertical-align:top;"|

Athletics (track and field)

Athletics Papua New Guinea announced a team of 11 athletes.
Men
Track and road events

Field events

Women
Track and road events

Field events

Boxing

The Papua New Guinea Amateur Boxing Union (PNGABU) announced a team of four elite boxers to the 2018 games.

Lawn bowls

Papua New Guinea will compete in Lawn bowls.

Men

Women

Rugby sevens

The Papua New Guinea men's team qualified after being ranked the highest not already qualified Commonwealth nation at the 2017 Oceania Sevens Championship.

Men's tournament

Roster

Himah Alu
Issac Aquilla
Nathan Baramun
Emmanuel Guise
Henry Kalua
Gairo Kapana
Samuel Malambes
Freddy Rova
Patrick Tatut
William Tirang
Eugene Tokavai
Wesley Vali

 Reserve: Arthur Clement

Pool A

Shooting

Papua New Guinea participated with 3 athletes (2 men and 1 woman).

Squash

Papua New Guinea participated with 2 athletes (1 man and 1 woman).

Individual

Doubles

Swimming

Papua New Guinea participated with 4 athletes (4 men).

Men

Table tennis

Papua New Guinea participated with 2 athletes (1 man and 1 woman).

Singles

Para-sport

Triathlon

Papua New Guinea participated with 1 athlete (1 woman).

Individual

Weightlifting

Papua New Guinea qualified six weightlifters.

See also
Papua New Guinea at the 2018 Summer Youth Olympics

References

Nations at the 2018 Commonwealth Games
Papua New Guinea at the Commonwealth Games
2018 in Papua New Guinean sport